Predajná is a village and municipality in the Brezno District, of the Banská Bystrica Region, located in central Slovakia.

References

External links
http://www.e-obce.sk/obec/predajna/predajna.html
Official homepage

Villages and municipalities in Brezno District